The 1981 Portland Timbers season was the seventh season for the Portland Timbers in the now-defunct North American Soccer League.

Squad  
The 1981 squad

North American Soccer League

Regular season

Northwest Division standings 

Pld = Matches played; W = Matches won; L = Matches lost; GF = Goals for; GA = Goals against; GD = Goal difference; Pts = PointsSource:

League results 

* = Shootout winSource:

Postseason

Playoff bracket 
 Best of 3 series

Source:

Playoff results 

Source:

References

1981
American soccer clubs 1981 season
1981 in sports in Oregon
Portland
1981 in Portland, Oregon